Secular education is a system of public education in countries with a secular government or separation between religion and state.

An example of a secular educational system would be the French public educational system, where conspicuous religious symbols have been banned in schools. 
While some religious groups are hostile to secularism and see such measures as promoting atheism, other citizens claim that the display of any religious symbol constitutes an infringement of the separation of church and state and a discrimination against atheist, agnostic and non-religious people.

Actions and controversies
In Turkey the promotion of Imam Hatip Islamic schools by the government following the March 2012 education reform bill, allegedly alarmed some Turkish citizens. The Education Reform Bill was written without public debate or even discussion in the Ministry of National Education's own consultative body; it did not even figure in the government’s 2011 election manifesto. Besides undermining Turkish secularism, the new measures would undermine educational standards and deepen social inequalities, according to education specialists. Turkey’s leading universities, including Sabancı University, Boğaziçi University, Middle East Technical University and Koç University, all issued press statements describing the reforms of 2012 as hastily conceived, retrograde and out of step with current thinking.
In Italy the Lautsi v. Italy case was brought before the European Court of Human Rights regarding the display of crucifixes in classrooms of state schools. 
In Romania the CNCD Decision 323/2006 was brought to the CNCD by Emil Moise, a teacher and parent from Buzău County, regarding the public display of Orthodox icons in classrooms and was supported by some high-profile activists. 
In 2009 a new body was formed, the Australian Secular Lobby, to promote secular education in Australia.
In Southern Thailand, the secular educational system is being undermined by insurgent groups by means of the destruction of schools and the assassination of teachers.

See also
French law on secularity and conspicuous religious symbols in schools
Humanum Genus
Ligue de l'enseignement
Secularism in France

References

External links
The case for a secular education system
Principle of Secular Education
Campaign for Secular Education

Secularism
Religion and education